Perineal may refer to:

 The perineum, the region of the body between the pubic arch and the tail bone
 Perineal artery, an artery supplying the perineal region
 Perineal nerve, a nerve innervating the perineal region

See also
Peroneal (disambiguation)
Peritoneal
Perennial (disambiguation)